Mudkhed Junction railway station is junction railway station serving the town of Mudkhed in Nanded district of Maharashtra. The station is located on Secunderabad–Manmad line and falls under Nanded railway division of South Central Railway.

A railway line to Adilabad, Wani and Majri Junction on Ballarshah–Sewagram Junction–Nagpur Junction section of New Delhi–Chennai line, branches off in the North-east.

The major stations near Mudkhed are Hazur Sahib Nanded railway station on west and Nizamabad railway station on east.

Routes
 Mudkhed––
 Mudkhed–––
 Mudkhed––

References

Railway stations in Nanded district
Railway junction stations in India
Nanded railway division